Macaco (Portuguese for "monkey" or "ape") may refer to:

Macaco (band), a Spanish musical group formed in 1997
Macaco (capoeira), a martial arts technique in capoeira
Macaco (term) or macaca, a Portuguese racial slur
Macaco, a comic strip, character, and children's magazine created by K-Hito
Macaco River, a tributary of the Três Voltas River in Santa Catarina, Brazil
Macaco River (Florida) or Charlotte River, a former name for a river that drained Lake Okeechobee
Jorge Patino (born 1973), nicknamed Macaco, Brazilian mixed martial arts fighter

See also 
Macaca or Macaque, a genus of Old World monkeys
Macaco Branco River, a tributary of the Uruguay River in Santa Catarina, Brazil
Macacos River (disambiguation)